Skin of my teeth ( ‘ōr šinnāy) is a phrase from the Bible. In Job 19:20, the King James Version of the Bible says, "My bone cleaveth to my skin and to my flesh, and I am escaped by the skin of my teeth."  In the Geneva Bible, the phrase is rendered as "I have escaped with the skinne of my tethe."

The verse from Job 19:20 can be resolved as follows: In the first clause, the author uses the Hebrew `or in its usual sense of "skin", associating it with "flesh" and "bones". In the second clause, he uses the Hebrew or as derived from the Arabic ghar / "the bones in which the teeth are set (Latin: os maxilla and os mandibula)". Therefore, the correct reading is: "My skin and flesh cling to my bones, and I am left with (only) my gums," giving us a stark description of the advanced stage of Job's disease.

In modern times, "by the skin of my teeth" is used to describe a situation from which one has barely managed to escape or achieve something; a close call.

Cultural references to the phrase
Skin o' My Tooth – 1928 book by Baroness Emma Orczy in which the phrase is a nickname of the main character, a lawyer; the nickname is given by a client who says that he was freed "by the skin o' my tooth"
The Skin of Our Teeth – 1942 play by Thornton Wilder with multiple Biblical allusions
"Skin o' My Teeth" – song on Megadeth's 1992 album Countdown to Extinction, referring to the theme of a suicide attempt
a reference to the quote in the song Alone, the 3rd track on Biting Elbows' 2020 album Shortening the Longing, talking about a bad break-up situation
"Skin of Her Teeth" – 2021 TV episode in Dexter: New Blood limited series in the Jeff Lindsay Dexter serial killer franchise
"Skin of My Teeth" – song from Demi Lovato's 2022 album Holy Fvck

See also
Hair's breadth

References

English-language idioms
Hebrew Bible words and phrases
Christian terminology